GMAC or G-MAC may refer to:

Organizations
 Ally Financial (General Motors Acceptance Corporation), traded as GMAC until 2010
 GMAC Insurance, former name of National General Insurance
 GMAC Real Estate, a former real estate franchised brokerage firm
 GMAC ResCap (Residential Capital), which includes GMAC Mortgage
 Graduate Management Admission Council, an international association of business schools
 GMA Canada, the Gospel Music Association of Canada, formerly the CGMA
 Global Markets Advistory Committee, part of the U.S. Commodity Futures Trading Commission

Computing
 Galois Message Authentication Code, a type of cryptographic message authentication code
 Giga multiply–accumulate operations per second, a rate of multiply–accumulate operations 
 Gigabit media access controller, for handling an Ethernet physical transceiver; See Gigabit Ethernet

Other uses
 Graeme McDowell (born 1979), Northern Irish professional golfer nicknamed G-Mac
 GMAC Bowl, a sponsored game of college level American football, now known as the LendingTree Bowl
 Great Midwest Athletic Conference, a U.S. college athletic conference established in 2011 and starting competition in 2012
 GMAC ebike motor, a modified MAC hub motor sold by Grin Technologies

See also
 GMAC massacre, a 1990 shooting by James Edward Pough in a car loan office in Florida, US